Paxinos is a census-designated place in Northumberland County, Pennsylvania, United States. It has a post office with the zip code 17860. In 2010, the population was 2,467 residents. Paxinos was founded in 1769 and was named for a Swanee Native American chief, according to its Pennsylvania Keystone Marker. The town is known in the area for its music store, which has a distinctive mural of a guitar player.

References

Census-designated places in Northumberland County, Pennsylvania
Census-designated places in Pennsylvania